Aechmea haltonii is a bromeliad, a flowering plant in the genus Aechmea which is endemic to Panama.

Cultivars
 Aechmea 'Anton'

References

haltonii
Flora of Panama
Plants described in 1992